The Child and the Killer is a British low budget 1959 crime film. It was also known as The Man in the Shadows.

Plot
Joe, a US army officer, is on the run after committing murder. He invades the home of the widowed Peggy, and orders her son Tommy at gunpoint to guide him through the backwaters of the English countryside to safety. But he reckons without U.S. army Captain Mather, who is in love with Tommy's mother.

Cast
Patricia Driscoll as Peggy
Robert Arden as Joe
Richard Williams as Tommy
Ryck Rydon as Mather
John McLaren as Major Finch
Robert Raglan as Inspector
Gary Thorne as Prior
Gordon Sterne as Sergeant
Frank Ellement as White

Critical reception
TV Guide called it a "routine crime melodrama"; while AllMovie thought the film had "elements in common with the much-later Kevin Costner vehicle A Perfect World".

References

External links

1959 films
1959 crime films
British crime films
1950s English-language films
1950s British films